Asphyxia is a Deaf Australian artist, writer, activist and public speaker. She is the author of Future Girl (Australian title) / The Words in My Hands (North American title), and winner of the Readings YA Book Award 2021. The book was selected by Kirkus as best YA fiction for 2021, by The Guardian as one of the top 20 best Australian books for 2020, and as a notable book for 2021 by the Children's Book Council of Australia, and for the Great Books Guide top books of 2021. The book was also shortlisted for the Indie Book Awards 2021, the Australian Book Industry Award 2021, and the Aurelis Award 2020. Asphyxia has joined forces with Orange Entertainment Co to adapt the book for the screen.

Formerly a puppeteer, she is also the author of the children's series The Grimstones, which won the APA Book Design Awards Best Designed Children's Series in 2013.

Life and career
She was born in Melbourne, the second eldest of eight children, being nicknamed Asphyxia by one of her brothers when she was a teenager. Being the eldest, and creative from a young age, she took it upon herself to create magical words of mystical creatures in which she enrolled her younger siblings and cousins to be a part. She attended a hearing school, and did not learn Auslan until she was 18, as her parents wanted her to have a high standard of education, and were not satisfied with the standard of the education for the deaf.

As a child, she had dreams of being a ballerina, but they disintegrated once it became clear her deafness prohibited this as a professional career, and after the Australian Ballet School turned her down because of her deafness. Instead, once she left school, she turned to circus, training with Circus Oz, specialising in the trapeze and hula-hoops. Here she discovered she could incorporate her deafness into her work rather than trying to hide it, realising it could enhance what she did. One of the ways she did this was by signing karaoke, which was a big success with her audiences.

After being a circus performer for ten years, Asphyxia discovered puppetry through Sergio Barrio, a master puppeteer, whom she discovered when overseas touring with her show, and begged him to teach her his craft. She then leapt into it whole heartedly, learning how to make her own puppets and sets for them. After some experimentation, she ended up with a gothic family which she named "The Grimstones". She then left the circus to travel around Australia performing with her puppets, which was a big success, and captivated children and adults alike.

After a couple of years of touring with her puppet family, Asphyxia got a call from the publishers Allen & Unwin, who told her that they thought that The Grimstones would make a great book. She embraced the idea, as she had always had aspirations to be an author, entering her first book when she was 12 in the St Kilda Writer's Festival where it won first place. In February 2012 she published the first of four books in the series, Hatched. The next three in the series, Mortimer Revealed (April 2012), Whirlwind (December 2012) and Music School (December 2013) soon followed. Future Girl (August 2020) won the 2021 Readings Young Adult Book Prize.

For 20 years, Asphyxia lived in a small cottage in inner city Melbourne which she built herself when she was just 22, with her partner and son. She now lives on a small farm in Northern NSW, Australia, where she combines food growing with art. She enjoys painting and other forms of art and creativity, which she shares with the world through her blog.

Her website also contains useful resources such as a free Auslan course and a music course she wrote for Deaf people.

Bibliography

Novels 
 Future Girl (2020)
 Published in the United States as The Words in My Hands (2021)

The Grimstones series
 Hatched (2012)
 Mortimer Revealed (2012)
 Whirlwind (2012)
 Music School (2013)
 The Grimstones Collection (2015)

Critical studies and reviews of Asphyxia's work
Future Girl

References 

Year of birth missing (living people)
Living people
Writers from Melbourne
21st-century Australian women writers
21st-century Australian writers
Deaf writers
Australian puppeteers
Australian women children's writers
Australian children's writers